Wild plum is a common name for several trees with edible fruits, and may refer to:
Wild growing forms of plums, especially
Prunus americana, native to eastern North America
Amelanchier, a genus in the Rosaceae producing small fruits lacking a pit
Harpephyllum caffrum, an Afrotropical tree species
Podocarpus drouynianus, a conifer native to Australia
Terminalia platyphylla, a tree native to Australia